Sergio Bruni (stage name of Guglielmo Chianese, 15 September 1921 – 22 June 2003) was a popular Italian singer, guitarist, and songwriter. He was often called "The Voice of Naples".

He was born in the commune of Villaricca, near Naples, Italy. At nine years of age he started attending a school of music. Two years later he was playing clarinet in a local band, which was his first experience as a musician. In 1938 the family moved to Chiaiano, where he started work as a labourer.

In September 1943, while convalescing from the army at home, he heard of the uprising against German troops in Naples. With a number of acquaintances he joined a group of volunteers to oppose the German army in the vicinity. While returning from an action he was seriously injured in a fire-fight with German soldiers, which left him with a permanent limp. After his release from hospital he returned to studying music under Vittorio Parisi and had his singing debut at the Royal Theater in Naples on 14 May 1944.

In October 1944 he won a singing competition which resulted in a contract with Radio Naples, where he worked under the guidance of Gino Campese.

In 1948, he married Maria Cerulli. They had four daughters.

Over the following years he had many successes, both live and recordings. In 1960, he returned to his home in Naples to concentrate on Neapolitan songs. He had a big hit with Carmela (1975), which has since become a classic of the Neapolitan genre, and this was followed up by the album 'a maschera Pulecenella, which led to major television and stage appearances the following year.

In March 2000, he left Naples to join his daughters in Rome. In 2001, he recorded his last song, sung with Lino Blandizzi. He died in hospital in Rome on 22 June 2003.

Filmography
 Serenata a Maria, directed by Luigi Capuano (1957)
 Che cosa è successo tra mio padre e tua madre? (Avanti!) directed di Billy Wilder (1972)
 Il viaggio, directed by Vittorio De Sica (1974)

References

External links
 Web site "The Voice of Naples"

1921 births
2003 deaths
Italian songwriters
Male songwriters
Musicians from Naples
20th-century Italian male singers